Maeroa is a suburb in western Hamilton in New Zealand. Originally an outlying suburb, it became part of Hamilton City in 1925 with the second boundary extension.

Demographics

Maeroa had a population of 3,726 at the 2018 New Zealand census, an increase of 390 people (11.7%) since the 2013 census, and an increase of 423 people (12.8%) since the 2006 census. There were 1,338 households, comprising 1,836 males and 1,890 females, giving a sex ratio of 0.97 males per female. The median age was 31.6 years (compared with 37.4 years nationally), with 789 people (21.2%) aged under 15 years, 957 (25.7%) aged 15 to 29, 1,614 (43.3%) aged 30 to 64, and 366 (9.8%) aged 65 or older.

Ethnicities were 66.3% European/Pākehā, 28.6% Māori, 6.5% Pacific peoples, 12.1% Asian, and 3.5% other ethnicities. People may identify with more than one ethnicity.

The percentage of people born overseas was 19.7, compared with 27.1% nationally.

Although some people chose not to answer the census's question about religious affiliation, 48.9% had no religion, 33.9% were Christian, 1.5% had Māori religious beliefs, 3.1% were Hindu, 1.9% were Muslim, 0.5% were Buddhist and 3.5% had other religions.

Of those at least 15 years old, 657 (22.4%) people had a bachelor's or higher degree, and 504 (17.2%) people had no formal qualifications. The median income was $32,500, compared with $31,800 nationally. 396 people (13.5%) earned over $70,000 compared to 17.2% nationally. The employment status of those at least 15 was that 1,635 (55.7%) people were employed full-time, 348 (11.8%) were part-time, and 171 (5.8%) were unemployed.

Maeroa Intermediate School 
The suburbs contains Maeroa Intermediate School, which became the first intermediate school in the Waikato region after being founded in 1954. The school coat of arms is registered with the College of Arms and includes arrows of desire, spear or sword of justice, lamp of knowledge and crosses. The bannerhead is also the school motto "I will not cease from mental fight", which is in line with the philosophy of a school that teaches children to think for themselves. Jerusalem is the school anthem.

The first principal of the school was Trevor Church. The school celebrated a 50th jubilee in 2004. That same year, the school hosted the Newscruise Challenge,  an annual interschool news and general knowledge quiz sponsored by the Waikato Times. Footballer Marco Rojas is a notable alumni of the school.

The school roll was  students as of

See also
List of streets in Hamilton
Suburbs of Hamilton, New Zealand

References

External links 
Maeroa Intermediate School website

Suburbs of Hamilton, New Zealand